Anton is a 1973 Norwegian drama film written and directed by Per Blom, starring Bjørn Erik Jessen. 15-year-old Anton Olsson (Jessen) lives in a little village in rural Norway. As his father loses his grip on reality, Anton's mother, who left home when Anton was little, returns.

Plot 
Anton is 15 years old, and the day he and old Johannes shoots the horse, the peace is gone. His father is already lost in his living room chair, and his mother turns up to make amends for not being there.

External links
 
 Anton at Filmweb.no (Norwegian)

1973 films
Films directed by Per Blom
1973 drama films
Norwegian drama films
1970s Norwegian-language films